A billion years or giga-annum (109 years) is a unit of time on the petasecond scale, more precisely equal to  seconds (or simply 1,000,000,000 years).

It is sometimes abbreviated  Gy, Ga ("giga-annum"), Byr and variants. The abbreviations Gya or bya are for "billion years ago", i.e. billion years before present.  
The terms are  used in geology, paleontology, geophysics,  astronomy, and physical cosmology.

The prefix giga- is preferred to billion- to avoid confusion in the long and short scales over the meaning of billion; the postfix annum may be further qualified for precision as a sidereal year or Julian year:
1 Gaj =  s,
1 Gas =  s (epoch J2000.0).
1 Gas =  y

Byr was formerly used in English-language geology and astronomy as a unit of one billion years. Subsequently, the term gigaannum (Ga) has increased in usage, with Gy or Gyr still sometimes used in English-language works (at the risk of confusion with Gy as abbreviation for the gray, a unit of radiation exposure). Astronomers use Gyr or Gy (or Ga, where the a stands for annum, Latin for "year") as the symbol for gigayear.

See also
 Kyr
 Myr
 Aeon
 Orders of magnitude (time)
 Year#Abbreviations yr and ya
 Year#SI prefix multipliers

References

Units of time
Geology
Units of measurement in astronomy